James Healy may refer to:

 James Augustine Healy (1830–1900), Irish and African-American Roman Catholic priest and bishop
 James Andrew Healy (1895–1983), American World War I flying ace
 James Healy (geologist) (1910–1994), New Zealand geologist, volcanologist and music critic
 James N. Healy (1916–1993), Irish actor, writer and theatre producer
 Jim Healy (trade unionist) (1898–1961), Australian trade unionist and Communist activist
 Jim Healy (sports commentator) (1923–1994)
 Jim Healy (Gaelic footballer) (born 1952), Irish Gaelic footballer
 James Healy (Home and Away), a fictional character from the Australian soap opera Home and Away